Salyan or Salyan Khalanga is the headquarters of Salyan District in the mid-west 'hills' of Nepal. It is located at 28°22'31N 82°9'42E at 1530 metres elevation (5020 feet).

Rapti Highway from Tulsipur follows the Sarda River 3 km. (1.9 miles) east of the town at 1,000 meters (3,280 feet) elevation.  As of 2010 it was being extended north to Musikot, Rukum District A spur road from this highway climbs up to Salyan Khalanga and the town has bus connections to Tulsipur, Ghorahi and Mahendra Highway. It is also the birthplace of Chandra Bahadur Dangi who was known for being the shortest male ever.

References

Populated places in Salyan District, Nepal
Municipalities in Karnali Province